is a 2007 OVA by Madhouse, directed by Kitarō Kōsaka and featuring Ken'ichi Yoshida as animation director.

Development and production
It is a sequel to Nasu: Summer in Andalusia. Kōsaka and Yoshida were animation supervisors on Studio Ghibli on numerous titles, including Spirited Away and Princess Mononoke. The Nasu universe is based on the manga Nasu created by Iou Kuroda.

Reception
The film won the best OVA award at the 7th Tokyo Anime Awards, held at the 2008 Tokyo International Anime Fair.

References

External links
VAP's official website
Madhouse official website

2007 anime films
2007 anime OVAs
Cycling in anime and manga
Cycling films
Films set in Japan
2000s Japanese-language films
Madhouse (company)
Japanese sequel films